Eucalyptus virens, commonly known as the shiny-leaved ironbark, is a species of small to medium-sized tree that is endemic to Queensland. It has hard ironbark on the trunk and branches, narrow lance-shaped adult leaves, flower buds in groups of seven, white flowers and hemispherical fruit.

Description
It has rough, grey to black, furrowed ironbark on its trunk and branches. Flowering has been recorded in February and the flowers are white.

Taxonomy and naming
Eucalyptus virens was first formally described in 1987 by Ian Brooker and Anthony Bean in the journal Brunonia from specimens collected near Injune in 1975. The specific epithet (virens) is a Latin word meaning "green", referring to the bright green leaves.

Distribution and habitat
The shiny-leaved ironbark grows in open forest on sandy soil on flats and undulating country. It is only known from three small populations near the Maranoa River, Tara and Inglewood in south-eastern Queensland.

Conservation status
This eucalypt is classified as "vulnerable" under the Australian Government Environment Protection and Biodiversity Conservation Act 1999 and the Queensland Government Nature Conservation Act 1992. The main threats to the species are timber harvesting and habitat loss due to land clearing.

See also
List of Eucalyptus species

References

Trees of Australia
virens
Myrtales of Australia
Flora of Queensland
Taxa named by Ian Brooker
Plants described in 1987
Endemic flora of Queensland
Taxa named by Anthony Bean